Barādarī, or Birādrī or Biraderi, means Brotherhood and originates from the Persian word  Baradar, meaning "Brother". In Pakistan and India, it is used to denote a number of social strata among South Asian Muslims. According to British author Anatol Lieven, "the most important force in Pakistani society" are Baradari, usually far stronger than any competing religious, ethnic, or ideological cause. Parties and political alliances in Pakistan are based on Baradari, not ideology. Baradari have also influenced politics in some parts of the United Kingdom where a significant number of people are of Pakistani descent, most notably in Bradford.

See also
 Caste system among South Asian Muslims
 Phratry, an institution of Ancient Greece similar in meaning and etymology.

References

Further reading
 Gilmartin, David (1994). "Biraderi and Bureaucracy: The Politics of Muslim Kinship Solidarity in 20th Century Punjab," International Journal of Punjab Studies 1, no. 1. 
January-June:10
 Peace, T., & Akhtar, P. (2015). Biraderi, bloc votes and bradford: Investigating the respect party's campaign strategy. The British Journal of Politics and International Relations, 17(2), 224-243.

 
 
+
Persian words and phrases
Pakistani class system